The 2015 Liverpool City Council election took take place on 7 May 2015 to elect members of Liverpool City Council in England. This was on the same day as other local elections.

Due to the 'in thirds' system of election, one third of the council were up for election, with direct comparisons to previous results made with the corresponding vote at the 2011 Liverpool City Council election.

Council composition
Prior to the election the composition of the council was:

After the election the composition of the council was:

Election result in 2015

Ward results
* - Existing Councillor seeking re-election.

(PARTY) - Party of former Councillor

Allerton and Hunts Cross

Anfield

Belle Vale

Central

Childwall

Church

Clubmoor

County

Cressington

Croxteth

Everton

Fazakerley

Greenbank

Kensington and Fairfield

Kirkdale

Knotty Ash

Mossley Hill

Norris Green

Old Swan

Picton

Prince's Park

Riverside

St. Michael's

Speke-Garston

Tuebrook & Stoneycroft

Warbreck

Wavertree

West Derby

Woolton

Yew Tree

References

2015 English local elections
May 2015 events in the United Kingdom
2015
2010s in Liverpool